Boruch Greenfeld, (1872–1956), was a rabbi and Torah scholar.

Born in Humenne, Slovakia (then Zemplén County, Kingdom of Hungary), Greenfield studied in Kisvárda under Moshe Greenwald. He married Rivkah Weinberger in 1891 in Stropkov where he founded a small yeshiva. Later he became the dayan (rabbinic judge) of Shebesh, Potneck, and Hermenshtat.

In 1923 he immigrated to the United States where he was a rabbi in several Pennsylvania cities and then in New York City, first in the Bronx and then the Lower East Side. In 1935 he moved to Palestine and became one of the leaders of the Edah HaChareidis.

He had five children that reached adulthood. The oldest, Mariam, her husband Nusen Baumhaft, and 14 of their 15 children were murdered in the Holocaust.

Sources 
 Ohel Boruch
 Moshian Shel Yisroel, by Shloima Yankel Gelbman
 
 
 Lkoros Hayhadus BTranselvany by Tzvi Yaakov Abraham pub. 1951

External links 
 Ivelt ר' ברוך גרינפעלד מהערמענשטאט ז"ל - י"א אייר תשט"ז

1872 births
1956 deaths
Hungarian Hasidic rabbis
American Hasidic rabbis
Hasidic rabbis in Mandatory Palestine
Rabbis of the Edah HaChareidis
Hasidic rabbis in Israel
Hazzans